Cyrtodactylus majulah is a species of gecko that is found in Singapore and Indonesia.

References 

Cyrtodactylus
Reptiles described in 2012